The following is a list of squads for each nation competing in football 5-a-side at the 2012 Summer Paralympics in London.

Group A

Brazil
The following is the Brazil squad in the football 5-a-side tournament of the 2012 Summer Paralympics.

China
The following is the China squad in the football 5-a-side tournament of the 2012 Summer Paralympics.

France
The following is the France squad in the football 5-a-side tournament of the 2012 Summer Paralympics.

Turkey
The following is the Turkey squad in the football 5-a-side tournament of the 2012 Summer Paralympics.

Group B

Argentina
The following is the Argentina squad in the football 5-a-side tournament of the 2012 Summer Paralympics.

Great Britain
The following is the Great Britain squad in the football 5-a-side tournament of the 2012 Summer Paralympics.

Iran
The following is the Iran squad in the football 5-a-side tournament of the 2012 Summer Paralympics.

Spain
The following is the Spain squad in the football 5-a-side tournament of the 2012 Summer Paralympics.

See also
 Football 7-a-side at the 2012 Summer Paralympics – Team squads

References

Squads
Paralympic association football squads